The 2014 Melbourne Vixens season saw Melbourne Vixens compete in the 2014 ANZ Championship. With a team coached by Simone McKinnis, captained by Bianca Chatfield and also featuring Tegan Caldwell, Geva Mentor, Madison Robinson and Catherine Cox, Melbourne Vixens won both the minor premiership and the overall championship.  Vixens defeated Queensland Firebirds in both the major semi-final and the grand final as they won their second premiership. They won their first in 2009.

Players

Player movements

Squad

Notes
  Erin Hoare, Amy Steel, Caitlyn Strachan and Joanna Weston were also members of the 2014 Victorian Fury squad.

Milestones
 Tegan Caldwell made her 50th ANZ Championship appearance in Round 6 against Queensland Firebirds.
 Geva Mentor made her 100th ANZ Championship appearance in Round 13 against Adelaide Thunderbirds. Mentor became the first import player to reach 100 games.
 Catherine Cox made her 250th senior club appearance in Round 10 against  New South Wales Swifts. Cox subsequently announced her retirement at the end of the season.

Gold medallists
Tegan Caldwell, Bianca Chatfield and Madison Robinson were all members of the Australia team that won the gold medal at the   2014 Commonwealth Games. The squad also included four former Vixens' players – Julie Corletto, Renae Hallinan, Sharni Layton and Caitlin Thwaites.

Regular season

Fixtures and results
Round 1

Round 2

Round 3

Round 4

Round 5

Round 6

Round 7

Round 8

Round 9

Round 10

Round 11
Melbourne Vixens received a bye.
Round 12

Round 13

Round 14

Final table

Finals

Major semi-final

Grand final

Award winners

Vixens awards

ANZ Championship awards

All Stars

Australian Netball Awards

References

Melbourne Vixens seasons
Melbourne Vixens